Moi-Yo Miller was the stage name of Mona Loretta Miller (24 April 1914 – 18 September 2018), an Australian entertainer who toured the world as a magician's assistant and illusionist of the stage magician Dante (a.k.a. Harry Jansen), during the 1930s and 1940s

Biography
Miller was born in  Geelong She first met Dante while still in her late teens when she was appearing in a musical revue in Melbourne. Dante had decided to recruit an Australian girl as an assistant after, in his words, "he saw in Melbourne more beautiful women per square block than he had seen in any other part of the World".

Miller dated Dante's son, Bill, and went on to work with Dante, staying with him for the rest of his performing career. She very quickly became his main assistant and an integral part of his show Sim Sala Bim. She was often billed as "Australia's Most Beautiful Woman". She once estimated that she had been sawed in half around 11,800 times during her career.

Miller became highly regarded among professional magic performers and is widely cited as one of the all-time great magic assistants. She features in the 2008 documentary movie, Women in Boxes, which explores the vital role of assistants in magic. In 1993 she received the Dragon Award presented by the J. Marberger Stuart Foundation. She celebrated her 100th birthday in 2014. A public art mural of Miller's face was created by artist Michael Cassar in June 2016 on the corner of James St and Minns Lane, Geelong.

References

Further reading

1914 births
2018 deaths
Australian centenarians
Australian magicians
People from Geelong
Women centenarians
Academy of Magical Arts Special Fellowship winners